Harold Isaza Gutiérrez (born June 29, 1995) is a Colombian professional footballer who last played for Club León.

References

1995 births
Living people
Colombian footballers
Colombian expatriate footballers
Association football midfielders
Once Caldas footballers
Club León footballers
Categoría Primera A players
Colombian expatriate sportspeople in Mexico
Expatriate footballers in Mexico
People from Manizales